Hanna Rosvall (born 10 February 2000) is a Swedish swimmer. She competed at the 2018 FINA World Swimming Championships (25 m) and 2021 FINA World Swimming Championships (25 m).

References

External links
 

2000 births
Living people
Swedish female backstroke swimmers
Place of birth missing (living people)
Swimmers at the 2015 European Games
European Games competitors for Sweden
European Aquatics Championships medalists in swimming
Medalists at the FINA World Swimming Championships (25 m)
21st-century Swedish women